Stuart Reid (born 1954, Aberdeen, Scotland) is a writer, analyst and former soldier.  A writer on, mainly, military history, his 2007 book The Secret War for Texas won the 2008 Summerfield G. Roberts Award awarded by the Sons of the Republic of Texas.

Selected works
Killiecrankie, 1689: First Jacobite Rising (Partizan Press, 1989)
King George's Army, 1740-93, Vol. 2 (Osprey, 1995)
All the King's Armies: a military history of the English Civil War (1998)
Scots Armies of the English Civil War (Osprey, 1999)
Wellington's Army in the Peninsula 1809-14 (Osprey, 2004)
Dunbar 1650: Cromwell's Most Famous Victory (Osprey, 2004)
 
 
 
 
Battles of the Scottish Lowlands (Battlefield Britain)
Cumberland's Culloden Army 1745-46 (Osprey, 2012)
Crown Covenant and Cromwell: The Civil Wars in Scotland 1639 - 1651 (Frontline Books, 2012)
Sheriffmuir 1715 (Frontline Books, 2014)

References

1954 births
Living people
Date of birth missing (living people)
20th-century Scottish historians
Writers from Aberdeen
21st-century Scottish historians
British Army officers